Castalia (pronounced "Cas-tale-yuh"), is a town in Nash County, North Carolina, United States. It is part of the Rocky Mount, North Carolina Metropolitan Statistical Area. The population was 268 at the 2010 census.

Geography
Castalia is located at  (36.081258, -78.058682).

Demographics

As of the census of 2000, there were 340 people, 132 households, and 102 families residing in the town. The population density was 462.4 people per square mile (177.4/km2). There were 139 housing units at an average density of 189.0 per square mile (72.5/km2). The racial makeup of the town was 50.59% White, 48.24% African American, and 1.18% Hispanic or Latino or more races.

There were 132 households, out of which 36.4% had children under the age of 18 living with them, 53.8% were married couples living together, 18.9% had a female householder with no husband present, and 22.7% were non-families. 20.5% of all households were made up of individuals, and 12.9% had someone living alone who was 65 years of age or older. The average household size was 2.58 and the average family size was 2.87.

In the town, the population was spread out, with 26.8% under the age of 18, 7.1% from 18 to 24, 31.5% from 25 to 44, 21.5% from 45 to 64, and 13.2% who were 65 years of age or older. The median age was 35 years. For every 100 females, there were 97.7 males. For every 100 females age 18 and over, there were 91.5 males.

The median income for a household in the town was $23,438, and the median income for a family was $29,375. Males had a median income of $23,750 versus $19,250 for females. The per capita income for the town was $12,455. About 23.2% of families and 22.9% of the population were below the poverty line, including 30.5% of those under age 18 and 37.5% of those age 65 or over.

Climate 
Castalia, being located in eastern North Carolina, has long hot humid summers, and winters which are short and mild by comparison to much of the rest of the country, with snow being a rarity. In Castalia, between 60 and 90 days per year are over 86 degrees Fahrenheit, according to the Heat Zone Map published by the American Horticultural Society. By comparison, the great majority of the upper midwest and northeast has less than 30 such days per year. These hot days, combined with the South's high humidity, make it sweltering in the summer. The average daytime temperature is in the high 70s or above for at least 5 months out of the year (May through September).

The following is the average weather for Castalia:

References

Towns in North Carolina
Towns in Nash County, North Carolina
Rocky Mount metropolitan area